The Jitajita, otherwise spelt Yitayita, are an indigenous Australian people of southern New South Wales.

Language
The Yitayita spoke one of the languages of the lower Murray river group that included Dadi Dadi and Kureinji, as is distinctive for the large number of monosyllables in its vocabulary.

Name
The tribal name Jitajita is a reduplicative endonym formed from their word for 'no' (jita). Numerous tribes in the area defined themselves in terms of the negative used. Early ethnographers marveled at the variety of words for 'no' among the Riverine tribes, as an index of the differences in their languages. Peter Beveridge remarked:
Each tribes possesses a gnalla wattow or postman, who can speak and understand the dialects of all the tribes within a radius of 150 miles. The persons of these officials are held sacred, even by tribes which are at feud with their own: they therefore negotiate all matters of barter and trade policy.

Country
They appear to have been closely related to the Muthi Muthi. Their northwestern boundaries reached the edge of the Parintji domain.

Alternative names
 Eethie-Eethie, Eethee Eethee, Eetha-eetha
 Ita-ita, Ithi-ithi, Iti-iti
 Tjuop
 Yetho, Yit-tha, Yitsa

Source:

Some words
 tin (foot)
 kapul (leg)

Notes

Citations

Sources

External links
 Nari-Nari Tribal Council - Official website

Aboriginal peoples of New South Wales